Francisco Correa da Cruz Airport  is the airport serving Humaitá, Brazil.

Airlines and destinations
No scheduled flights operate at this airport.

Access

See also

List of airports in Brazil

References

External links

Humaitá, Amazonas
Airports in Amazonas (Brazilian state)